Daniel Stolz von Stolzenberg (Daniel Stolcius) (1600–1660) was a Bohemian physician and writer on alchemy, a pupil of Michael Maier in Prague.  His name is often given as 'von Stolcenberg', i.e. from Stolzenberg, or 'von Stolcenbeerg'.

He is known for his 1624 emblem book Viridarium Chymicum, a significant anthology  with sources in previous collections. It was followed in 1627 by the Hortulus Hermeticus.

References
Adam McLean (editor), Patricia Tahil (translator) (1980) The Hermetic Garden of Daniel Stolcius

Notes

1600 births
1660 deaths
Czech alchemists
17th-century Bohemian physicians
Czech non-fiction writers
17th-century alchemists
Physicians from Prague